Jambalaya is an American Creole and Cajun rice dish of French (especially Provençal cuisine), African, and Spanish influence, consisting mainly of meat and vegetables mixed with rice.

Ingredients 
Traditionally, the meat includes sausage of some sort, often a smoked meat such as andouille, along with pork or chicken and seafood (less common), such as crawfish or shrimp. The vegetables are usually a sofrito-like mixture known as the "trinity" in Cajun cooking, consisting of onion, celery, and green bell pepper, though other vegetables such as okra, carrots, tomatoes, corn, chilis and garlic are also used. 

After browning and sauteeing the meat and vegetables, rice is added with seasonings and broth, and the entire dish is cooked together until the rice is done.

Similar dishes 
Jambalaya is similar to (but distinct from) other rice-and-meat dishes known in Louisiana cuisine such as gumbo and étouffée. 

Gumbo uses similar sausages, meats, seafood, vegetables and seasonings. However, gumbo includes filé powder or okra, which are not common in jambalaya. Gumbo is also usually served over white rice, which is prepared separately from the rest of the dish, unlike jambalaya, where the rice is prepared with the other ingredients. 

Étouffée is a stew that always includes shellfish such as shrimp or crawfish but does not have the sausage common to jambalaya and gumbo. Also, like gumbo, étouffée is usually served over separately prepared rice.

Origins 
Jambalaya is a Louisiana-born dish that has its origins in historical influences from Africa and Spain. Although there is documented historical evidence connecting jambalaya to European origins, however, due to the trans-Atlantic slave trade, there are many sources that link the origin back to African origins, where the dish has undeniable similarities to Jollof rice.

Varieties
There are two primary methods of making jambalaya, differentiated by the presence or absence of tomatoes.

The first is Creole jambalaya (also called "red jambalaya"). First, meat is added to the trinity of celery, peppers, and onions; the meat is usually chicken and sausage such as andouille or smoked sausage.  Next vegetables and tomatoes are added to cook, followed by seafood. Rice and stock are added in equal proportions at the very end. The mixture is brought to a boil and left to simmer for 20 to 60 minutes, depending on the recipe, with infrequent stirring. Towards the end of the cooking process, stirring usually ceases.
Some versions call for the jambalaya to be baked after the cooking of all the ingredients.

The second style, more characteristic of southwestern and south-central Louisiana, is Cajun jambalaya, which contains no tomatoes (the idea being the farther away from New Orleans one gets, the less common tomatoes are in dishes). The meat is browned in a cast-iron pot. The bits of meat that stick to the bottom of the pot (sucs) are what give a Cajun jambalaya its brown color. A little vegetable oil is added if there is not enough fat in the pot. The trinity (of 50% onions, 25% celery, and 25% green or red bell pepper, although proportions can be altered to suit one's taste) is added and sautéed until soft. Stock and seasonings are added in the next step, and then the meats are returned to the pot. This mixture is then simmered, covered, for at least one hour. Lastly, the  mixture is brought to a boil and rice is added to the pot. It is then covered and left to simmer over very low heat for at least 1/2 hour without stirring. The dish is finished when the rice has cooked.

In a less common method, meat and vegetables are cooked separately from the rice. At the same time, rice is cooked in a savory stock. It is added to the meat and vegetables before serving. This is called "white jambalaya". This dish is rare in Louisiana as it is seen as a "quick" attempt to make jambalaya, popularized outside the state to shorten cooking time.

Many people in the south, and typically in Louisiana, enjoy a simpler jambalaya style. This style is cooked the same as the Cajun style, but there are no vegetables. Many restaurants serve this style as opposed to the others, because it is more child-friendly, has a more consistent texture, and is easier to make.

Jambalaya is considered by most Louisianans to be a filling but simple-to-prepare rice dish; gumbos, étouffées, and creoles are considered more difficult to perfect. Most often a long grain white rice is used in making jambalaya.

Jambalaya is differentiated from gumbo and étouffée by the way in which the rice is included. In these dishes, the rice is cooked separately and is served as a bed on which the main dish is served. In the usual method of preparing jambalaya, a rich stock is created from vegetables, meat, and seafood; raw rice is then added to the broth and the flavor is absorbed by the grains as the rice cooks.

History
The history of jambalaya is shrouded in mystery. There is no evidence of any particular old world dish associated with jambalaya. Jambalaya was traditionally made from whatever ingredients were handy, such as seafood, fresh meats and smoked meats. Tomatoes may be present or absent in its preparation.

There is some folklore that states jambalaya originates from the French Quarter of New Orleans, in the original sector. This may or may not be true. It was probably an attempt by the Spanish to make paella in the New World, where saffron was not readily available due to import costs and the French in Louisiana named it. Tomatoes would have become the substitute for saffron. 

French influence was strong in New Orleans, and native spices from Louisiana, the gulf coast and the Caribbean may have changed this pilaf or paella into a unique New World dish.

New Orleans style jambalaya vs Acadiana style jambalaya
In modern Louisiana, the dish has evolved along a variety of different lines. 

New Orleans style jambalaya, known in Acadiana as “red jambalaya”, is found primarily in and around New Orleans, where it is simply known as "jambalaya". New Orleans style jambalaya includes tomatoes, whereas Acadiana style jambalaya usually does not.

Acadiana style jambalaya originates from Louisiana's rural, low-lying swamp country where crawfish, shrimp, oysters, alligator, duck, turtle, boar, venison, nutria and other game were readily available. Any variety or combination of meats, including chicken or turkey, may be used to make jambalaya. Acadiana style jambalaya is known as "brown jambalaya" in the Greater New Orleans area (except for the lower Westbank where it can be found among some families); to folks from Acadiana it is simply known as "jambalaya".

Jambalaya in print
The first appearance in print of any variant of the word 'jambalaya' in any language occurred in Leis amours de Vanus; vo, Lou paysan oou théâtré, by Fortuné (Fortunat) Chailan, first published in Provençal dialect in 1837. 

The earliest appearance of the word in print in English occurs in the May 1849 issue of the American Agriculturalist, page 161, where Solon Robinson refers to a recipe for "Hopping Johnny (jambalaya)", however he made a mistake in identifying jambalaya as "Hopping Johnny", which is an entirely different dish with different origins and different birth state. 

Jambalaya did not appear in a cookbook until 1878, when the Gulf City Cook Book, by the ladies of the St. Francis Street Methodist Episcopal Church, was printed in South Mobile, Alabama. It contains a recipe for "JAM BOLAYA".

Jambalaya had a brief jump in popularity during the 1920s and 1930s because of its flexible recipe. The dish was little more than the rice and vegetables the populace could afford; the recipe grew from humble roots.

Jambalaya capital of the world
In 1968, Louisiana Governor John J. McKeithen proclaimed Gonzales, Louisiana, "the Jambalaya capital of the world". Every spring, the annual Jambalaya Festival is held in Gonzales.

Etymology
The Oxford English Dictionary indicates that  comes from the Provençal word , meaning a mish mash, or mixup, and also meaning a pilaf (pilau) of rice. This is supported by the fact that the first printed appearance of the word is in a Provençal poem published in 1837.

A folk etymology of the word suggests that it is the fusion of two Spanish words:  ("ham") +  (a rice dish). However, the evidence for this idea is thin. Ham is not a featured element of the dish, and Spanish speakers would call a ham paella , not .

Another history, per Louisiana chef John Folse, author of The Encyclopedia of Cajun & Creole Cuisine (2004), is that jambalaya is a contraction of jambon à la yaya, meaning "ham with rice", from French jambon and Yoruba yaya.

See also

 List of regional dishes of the United States
 List of rice dishes

References

External links

 Jambalaya: history, origins and etymology

American stews
American rice dishes
Cajun cuisine
Cuisine of New Orleans
Louisiana cuisine
Articles containing video clips
Wild game dishes
Sausage dishes
Seafood and rice dishes